Dainius Gleveckas (born 5 March 1977) is a retired Lithuanian football defender.

References

External links
 

1977 births
Living people
Lithuanian footballers
Lithuania international footballers
Lithuanian expatriate footballers
FC Shakhtar Donetsk players
FC Mariupol players
FK Ekranas players
Ukrainian Premier League players
Expatriate footballers in Ukraine
Lithuanian expatriate sportspeople in Ukraine
Association football central defenders